Ouau en Namu lakes is a protected area of Libya.

References

Protected areas of Libya
Lakes of Libya